The Live Earth concert in Washington, D.C., officially known as "Mother Earth", was held on the National Mall in Washington, D.C., United States and was sponsored by and held on the premises/venue of the Smithsonian's National Museum of the American Indian.

It was only hours before the Washington D.C. concert was scheduled to begin that organizers were able to secure a venue for the last-minute addition to the schedule. The Washington Post reported the U.S. capital had been Gore's first choice for the main concert, but the National Mall was booked. The main concert was moved to New Jersey, but Gore made a surprise announcement during a July 6 media interview that a concert would take place on the plaza of the Museum of the American Indian. "Some who don't understand what is now at stake tried to stop this event on the Mall, but here we are. [crowd  is cheering] And it wasn't the cavalry who came to our rescue, it was the American Indians," Gore said during brief opening remarks carried live on the website . Only the first 200 attendees were able to directly view the event at the Museum. Others watched Gore speak and Brooks play from what event organizers called a "JumboTron" outside the immediate viewing area. Due to last minute organizing, there were no working audio speakers that could project sound to the JumboTron viewers.

Running Order
Tim Johnson (introduction) (WSH 16:00)
Henrietta Mann and Katsi Cook (presenters) (WSH 16:05)
Blues Nation - "What", "Can" (WSH 16:10)
Garth Brooks (WSH 16:55)
Iyanka Cooray ft Hasula Prematilaka (WSH 17:40)
Kim Richey (WSH 18:15)
Native Roots - "Wine", "The World", "Rain Us Love", "Native Indian People Have Survived", "I Wanna Know", "Song", "The Place I Call Home" (WSH 19:00)
Yarina - Presentation, "Going Back to our Homeland", "Festival of the Sun" (WSH 19:45)
Trisha Yearwood (WSH 20:30)
Presenter
Al Gore

References

Washington
2007 in American music
National Mall
Music of Washington, D.C.
2007 in Washington, D.C.